In graph theory, the planar separator theorem is a form of isoperimetric inequality for planar graphs, that states that any planar graph can be split into smaller pieces by removing a small number of vertices. Specifically, the removal of  vertices from an -vertex graph (where the  invokes big O notation) can partition the graph into disjoint subgraphs each of which has at most  vertices.

Since their work, the separator theorem has been reproven in several different ways, the constant in the  term of the theorem has been improved, and it has been extended to certain classes of nonplanar graphs.

Repeated application of the separator theorem produces a separator hierarchy which may take the form of either a tree decomposition or a branch-decomposition of the graph. Separator hierarchies may be used to devise efficient divide and conquer algorithms for planar graphs, and dynamic programming on these hierarchies can be used to devise exponential time and fixed-parameter tractable algorithms for solving NP-hard optimization problems on these graphs. Separator hierarchies may also be used in nested dissection, an efficient variant of Gaussian elimination for solving sparse systems of linear equations arising from finite element methods.

Beyond planar graphs, separator theorems have been applied to other classes of graphs including graphs excluding a fixed minor, nearest neighbor graphs, and finite element meshes. The existence of a separator theorem for a class of graphs can be formalized and quantified by the concepts of treewidth and polynomial expansion.

Statement of the theorem

Such a partition is known as a separation. If a separation is given, then the intersection of the vertex sets forms a separator, and the vertices that belong to one subgraph but not the other form separated subsets each having at most  vertices.

The constant  in the statement of the separator theorem is arbitrary and may be replaced by any other number in the open interval  without changing the form of the theorem: a partition into more equal subsets may be obtained from a less-even partition by repeatedly splitting the larger sets in the uneven partition and regrouping the resulting connected components.

Example

Consider a grid graph with  rows and  columns; the number  of vertices equals . If  is odd, there is a single central row, and otherwise there are two rows equally close to the center; similarly, if  is odd, there is a single central column, and otherwise there are two columns equally close to the center. If  (as in the illustration), then choosing a central column will give a separator  with  vertices, and similarly if  then choosing a central row will give a separator with at most  vertices. Thus, every grid graph has a separator  of size at most , the removal of which partitions it into two connected components, each of size at most .

The planar separator theorem states that a similar partition can be constructed in any planar graph.

Constructions

Breadth-first layering
 augment the given planar graph by additional edges, if necessary, so that it becomes maximal planar (every face in a planar embedding is a triangle). If  is the median level (the level such that the numbers of vertices at higher and lower levels are both at most ) then there must be levels  and  that are  steps above and below  respectively and that contain  vertices, respectively, for otherwise there would be more than  vertices in the levels near . The size of the separator  constructed in this way is at most . The vertices of the separator and the two disjoint subgraphs can be found in linear time.

This proof of the separator theorem applies as well to weighted planar graphs, in which each vertex has a non-negative cost.

 suggest a simplified version of this approach: they augment the graph to be maximal planar and construct a breadth first search tree as before. Then, for each edge  that is not part of the tree, they form a cycle by combining  with the tree path that connects its endpoints. They then use as a separator the vertices of one of these cycles. Although this approach cannot be guaranteed to find a small separator for planar graphs of high diameter, their experiments indicate that it outperforms the Lipton–Tarjan and Djidjev breadth-first layering methods on many types of planar graph.

Simple cycle separators
For a graph that is already maximal planar it is possible to show a stronger construction of a simple cycle separator, a cycle of small length such that the inside and the outside of the cycle (in the unique planar embedding of the graph) each have at most  vertices.  proves this (with a separator size of ) by using the Lipton–Tarjan technique for a modified version of breadth first search in which the levels of the search form simple cycles.

 prove the existence of simple cycle separators more directly: they let  be a cycle of at most  vertices, with at most  vertices outside , that forms as even a partition of inside and outside as possible, and they show that these assumptions force  to be a separator. Additionally,  must have length exactly , as otherwise it could be improved by replacing one of its edges by the other two sides of a triangle. However, the total length of these paths would necessarily exceed , a contradiction. With some additional work they show by a similar method that there exists a simple cycle separator of size at most .

Their method can also find simple cycle separators for graphs with non-negative vertex weights, with separator size at most , and can generate separators with smaller size at the expense of a more uneven partition of the graph. In biconnected planar graphs that are not maximal, there exist simple cycle separators with size proportional to the Euclidean norm of the vector of face lengths that can be found in near-linear time.

Circle separators
According to the Koebe–Andreev–Thurston circle-packing theorem, any planar graph may be represented by a packing of circular disks in the plane with disjoint interiors, such that two vertices in the graph are adjacent if and only if the corresponding pair of disks are mutually tangent. As  show, for such a packing, there exists a circle that has at most  disks touching or inside it, at most  disks touching or outside it, and that crosses  disks.

To prove this, Miller et al. use stereographic projection to map the packing onto the surface of a unit sphere in three dimensions. By choosing the projection carefully, the center of the sphere can be made into a centerpoint of the disk centers on its surface, so that any plane through the center of the sphere partitions it into two halfspaces that each contain or cross at most  of the disks. If a plane through the center is chosen uniformly at random, a disk will be crossed with probability proportional to its radius. Therefore, the expected number of disks that are crossed is proportional to the sum of the radii of the disks. However, the sum of the squares of the radii is proportional to the total area of the disks, which is at most the total surface area of the unit sphere, a constant. This plane intersects the sphere in a great circle, which projects back down to a circle in the plane with the desired properties. The  disks crossed by this circle correspond to the vertices of a planar graph separator that separates the vertices whose disks are inside the circle from the vertices whose disks are outside the circle, with at most  vertices in each of these two subsets.

This method leads to a randomized algorithm that finds such a separator in linear time, and a less-practical deterministic algorithm with the same linear time bound. By analyzing this algorithm carefully using known bounds on the packing density of circle packings, it can be shown to find separators of size at most

The size of the separators it produces can be further improved, in practice, by using a nonuniform distribution for the random cutting planes.

The stereographic projection in the Miller et al. argument can be avoided by considering the smallest circle containing a constant fraction of the centers of the disks and then expanding it by a constant picked uniformly in the range . As in Miller et al., the disks intersecting the expanded circle form a valid separator, and in expectation, the separator is of the right size. The resulting constants are somewhat worse.

Spectral partitioning
Spectral clustering methods, in which the vertices of a graph are grouped by the coordinates of the eigenvectors of matrices derived from the graph, have long been used as a heuristic for graph partitioning problems for nonplanar graphs. As  show, spectral clustering can also be used to derive an alternative proof for a weakened form of the planar separator theorem that applies to planar graphs with bounded degree. In their method, the vertices of a given planar graph are sorted by the second coordinates of the eigenvectors of the Laplacian matrix of the graph, and this sorted order is partitioned at the point that minimizes the ratio of the number of edges cut by the partition to the number of vertices on the smaller side of the partition. Although this partition may not be balanced, repeating the partition within the larger of the two sides and taking the union of the cuts formed at each repetition will eventually lead to a balanced partition with  edges. The endpoints of these edges form a separator of size .

Edge separators
Bounds on the size of an edge separator involve the degree of the vertices as well as the number of vertices in the graph: the planar graphs in which one vertex has degree , including the wheel graphs and star graphs, have no edge separator with a sublinear number of edges, because any edge separator would have to include all the edges connecting the high degree vertex to the vertices on the other side of the cut. However, every planar graph with maximum degree  has an edge separator of size .

A simple cycle separator in the dual graph of a planar graph forms an edge separator in the original graph.

 describe a polynomial time algorithm for finding the smallest edge separator that partitions a graph  into two subgraphs of equal size, when  is an induced subgraph of a grid graph with no holes or with a constant number of holes. However, they conjecture that the problem is NP-complete for arbitrary planar graphs, and they show that the complexity of the problem is the same for grid graphs with arbitrarily many holes as it is for arbitrary planar graphs.

Lower bounds

In a  grid graph, a set  of  points can enclose a subset of at most  grid points, where the maximum is achieved by arranging  in a diagonal line near a corner of the grid. Therefore, in order to form a separator that separates at least  of the points from the remaining grid,  needs to be at least .

There exist -vertex planar graphs (for arbitrarily large values of ) such that, for every separator  that partitions the remaining graph into subgraphs of at most  vertices,  has at least . The construction involves approximating a sphere by a convex polyhedron, replacing each of the faces of the polyhedron by a triangular mesh, and applying isoperimetric theorems for the surface of the sphere.

Separator hierarchies
Separators may be combined into a separator hierarchy of a planar graph, a recursive decomposition into smaller graphs.

A separator hierarchy of this type forms the basis for a tree decomposition of the given graph, in which the set of vertices associated with each tree node is the union of the separators on the path from that node to the root of the tree. That is, a separator formed in this way has width , and can be used to show that every planar graph has treewidth .

Constructing a separator hierarchy directly, by traversing the binary tree top down and applying a linear-time planar separator algorithm to each of the induced subgraphs associated with each node of the binary tree, would take a total of  time. However, it is possible to construct an entire separator hierarchy in linear time, by using the Lipton–Tarjan breadth-first layering approach and by using appropriate data structures to perform each partition step in sublinear time.

The width of any separation in this decomposition is, again, bounded by the sum of the sizes of the separators on a path from any node to the root of the hierarchy, so any branch-decomposition formed in this way has width  and any planar graph has branchwidth . Although many other related graph partitioning problems are NP-complete, even for planar graphs, it is possible to find a minimum-width branch-decomposition of a planar graph in polynomial time.

By applying methods of  more directly in the construction of branch-decompositions,  show that every planar graph has branchwidth at most , with the same constant as the one in the simple cycle separator theorem of Alon et al. Since the treewidth of any graph is at most  its branchwidth, this also shows that planar graphs have treewidth at most .

Other classes of graphs
Some sparse graphs do not have separators of sublinear size: in an expander graph, deleting up to a constant fraction of the vertices still leaves only one connected component.

Possibly the earliest known separator theorem is a result of  that any tree can be partitioned into subtrees of at most  vertices each by the removal of a single vertex. In particular, the vertex that minimizes the maximum component size has this property, for if it did not then its neighbor in the unique large subtree would form an even better partition. By applying the same technique to a tree decomposition of an arbitrary graph, it is possible to show that any graph has a separator of size at most equal to its treewidth.

They group the vertices of the graph into breadth-first levels and find two levels the removal of which leaves at most one large component consisting of a small number of levels. This remaining component can be made planar by removing a number of breadth-first paths proportional to the genus, after which the Lipton–Tarjan method can be applied to the remaining planar graph. The result follows from a careful balancing of the size of the removed two levels against the number of levels between them. If the graph embedding is given as part of the input, its separator can be found in linear time. Graphs of genus  also have edge separators of size .

Graphs of bounded genus form an example of a family of graphs closed under the operation of taking minors, and separator theorems also apply to arbitrary minor-closed graph families. In particular, if a graph family has a forbidden minor with  vertices, then it has a separator with  vertices, and such a separator can be found in time  for any .

The circle separator method of  generalizes to the intersection graphs of any system of -dimensional balls with the property that any point in space is covered by at most some constant number  of balls, to -nearest-neighbor graphs in  dimensions, and to the graphs arising from finite element meshes. The sphere separators constructed in this way partition the input graph into subgraphs of at most  vertices.

Conversely, graphs with polynomial expansion have sublinear separator theorems.

Applications

Divide and conquer algorithms
Separator decompositions can be of use in designing efficient divide and conquer algorithms for solving problems on planar graphs. As an example, one problem that can be solved in this way is to find the shortest cycle in a weighted planar digraph. This may be solved by the following steps:
Return the shortest of the cycles found by the above steps.

His algorithm uses the same separator-based divide and conquer structure, but uses simple cycle separators rather than arbitrary separators, so that the vertices of  belong to a single face of the graphs inside and outside the cycle separator. He then replaces the   separate calls to Dijkstra's algorithm with more sophisticated algorithms to find shortest paths from all vertices on a single face of a planar graph and to combine the distances from the two subgraphs. For weighted but undirected planar graphs, the shortest cycle is equivalent to the minimum cut in the dual graph and can be found in  time, and the shortest cycle in an unweighted undirected planar graph (its girth) may be found in time . (However, the faster algorithm for unweighted graphs is not based on the separator theorem.)

Frederickson proposed another faster algorithm for single source shortest paths by implementing separator theorem in planar graphs. This is an improvement of Dijkstra's algorithm with iterative search on a carefully selected subset of the vertices. This version takes  time in an -vertex graph. Separators are used to find a division of a graph, that is, a partition of the edge-set into two or more subsets, called regions. A node is said to be contained in a region if some edge of the region is incident to the node. A node contained in more than one region is called a boundary node of the regions containing it. The method uses the notion of a -division of an -node graph that is a graph division into  regions, each containing  nodes including  boundary nodes. Frederickson showed that an -division can be found in  time by recursive application of separator theorem.

The sketch of his algorithm to solve the problem is as follows.

 Preprocessing Phase: Partition the graph into carefully selected subsets of vertices and determine the shortest paths between all pairs of vertices in these subsets, where intermediate vertices on this path are not in the subset. This phase requires a planar graph  to be transformed into  with no vertex having degree greater than three. This phase also ensures the following properties of a suitable -division. A suitable -division of a planar graph is an -division such that,
 each boundary vertex is contained in at most three regions, and
 any region that is not connected consists of connected components, all of which share boundary vertices with exactly the same set of either one or two connected regions.
 Search Phase:
 Main Thrust: Find shortest distances from the source to each vertex in the subset.
 Mop-up: Determine shortest distances to every remaining vertex.

Henzinger et al. extended Frederickson's -division technique for the single source shortest path algorithm in planar graphs for nonnegative edge-lengths and proposed a linear time algorithm. Their method generalizes Frederickson's notion of graph-divisions such that now an -division of an -node graph is a division into  regions, each containing  nodes, each having at most  boundary nodes. If an -division is repeatedly divided into smaller regions, that is called a recursive division. This algorithm uses approximately  levels of divisions, where  denotes the iterated logarithm function. Each leaf (atomic region) represents a region containing exactly one edge.

Nested dissection is a separator based divide and conquer variation of Gaussian elimination for solving sparse symmetric systems of linear equations with a planar graph structure, such as the ones arising from the finite element method. It involves finding a separator for the graph describing the system of equations, recursively eliminating the variables in the two subproblems separated from each other by the separator, and then eliminating the variables in the separator.

Klein, Mozes and Weimann gave an -time, linear-space algorithm to find the shortest path distances from a source vertex  to all other vertices for a directed planar graph with positive and negative arc-lengths containing no negative cycles. Nodes through which  passes are boundary nodes. The boundary nodes in each graph  lie on the boundary of a single face .

The overview of their approach is given below. 
 Recursive call: The first stage recursively computes the distances from  within each graph . 
This takes  time.
This stage takes  time.
This stage requires  time.

An important part of this algorithm is the use of price functions and reduced lengths. It is useful in transforming a shortest-path problem involving positive and negative lengths into one involving only nonnegative lengths, which can then be solved using Dijkstra's algorithm.

The separator based divide and conquer paradigm has also been used to design data structures for dynamic graph algorithms and point location, algorithms for polygon triangulation, shortest paths, and the construction of nearest neighbor graphs, and approximation algorithms for the maximum independent set of a planar graph.

Exact solution of NP-hard optimization problems
For instance, bounds of this form are known for finding maximum independent sets, Steiner trees, and Hamiltonian cycles, and for solving the travelling salesman problem on planar graphs. Similar methods involving separator theorems for geometric graphs may be used to solve Euclidean travelling salesman problem and Steiner tree construction problems in time bounds of the same form.

For instance, time bounds of this form are known for finding vertex covers and dominating sets of size .

Approximation algorithms
 observed that the separator theorem may be used to obtain polynomial time approximation schemes for NP-hard optimization problems on planar graphs such as finding the maximum independent set. Specifically, by truncating a separator hierarchy at an appropriate level, one may find a separator of size  the removal of which partitions the graph into subgraphs of size at most , for any constant . By the four-color theorem, there exists an independent set of size at least , so the removed nodes form a negligible fraction of the maximum independent set, and the maximum independent sets in the remaining subgraphs can be found independently in time exponential in their size.

Similar separator-based approximation schemes have also been used to approximate other hard problems such as vertex cover.  use separators in a different way to approximate the travelling salesman problem for the shortest path metric on weighted planar graphs; their algorithm uses dynamic programming to find the shortest tour that, at each level of a separator hierarchy, crosses the separator a bounded number of times, and they show that as the crossing bound increases the tours constructed in this way have lengths that approximate the optimal tour.

Graph compression
Separators have been used as part of data compression algorithms for representing planar graphs and other separable graphs using a small number of bits. The basic principle of these algorithms is to choose a number  and repeatedly subdivide the given planar graph using separators into  subgraphs of size at most , with  vertices in the separators. The remainder of the graph, formed by the separator vertices, may be represented explicitly or by using a recursive version of the same data structure. Using this method, planar graphs and many more restricted families of graphs may be encoded using a number of bits that is information-theoretically optimal: if there are  -vertex graphs in the family of graphs to be represented, then an individual graph in the family can be represented using only  bits. It is also possible to construct representations of this type in which one may test adjacency between vertices, determine the degree of a vertex, and list neighbors of vertices in constant time per query, by augmenting the table of subgraphs with additional tabular information representing the answers to the queries.

Universal graphs
Separators can be used to show that the -vertex planar graphs have universal graphs with  vertices and  edges.

This may be shown by using the usual form of the separator theorem repeatedly to partition the graph until all the components of the partition can be arranged into two subsets of fewer than  vertices, and then moving vertices from these subsets into the separator as necessary until it has the given size.

Once a separator theorem of this type is shown, it can be used to produce a separator hierarchy for -vertex planar graphs that again does not depend on the graph structure: the tree-decomposition formed from this hierarchy has width  and can be used for any planar graph. The set of all pairs of vertices in this tree-decomposition that both belong to a common node of the tree-decomposition forms a trivially perfect graph with  vertices that contains every -vertex planar graph as a subgraph. A similar construction shows that bounded-degree planar graphs have universal graphs with  edges, where the constant hidden in the O notation depends on the degree bound. Any universal graph for planar graphs (or even for trees of unbounded degree) must have  edges.

See also
Vertex separator
Geometric separator

Notes

References

, as cited by 

, as cited by 

Planar graphs
Theorems in graph theory